George M. Duke (January 12, 1946 – August 5, 2013) was an American keyboardist, composer, singer-songwriter and record producer. He worked with numerous artists as arranger, music director, writer and co-writer, record producer and as a professor of music. He first made a name for himself with the album The Jean-Luc Ponty Experience with the George Duke Trio. He was known primarily for 32 solo albums, of which A Brazilian Love Affair from 1979 was his most popular, as well as for his collaborations with other musicians, particularly Frank Zappa.

Biography
George M. Duke was born in San Rafael, California, United States, to Thadd Duke and Beatrice Burrell and raised in Marin City. At four years old, he became interested in the piano. His mother took him to see Duke Ellington in concert and  told him about this experience. "I don't remember it too well, but my mother told me I went crazy. I ran around saying 'Get me a piano, get me a piano!'" He began his formal piano studies at the age of seven at a local Baptist church.

He attended Tamalpais High School in Mill Valley before earning a bachelor's degree in trombone and composition with a minor in contrabass from the San Francisco Conservatory of Music in 1967. He earned a master's degree in composition from San Francisco State University in 1975.

Although Duke started playing classical music, he credited his cousin Charles Burrell for convincing him to switch to jazz. He explained that he "wanted to be free" and Burrell "more or less made the decision for me" by convincing him to "improvise and do what you want to do". He taught a course on jazz and American culture at Merritt College in Oakland.

Duke recorded his first album in 1966. His second was with French violinist Jean-Luc Ponty, with whom he performed in San Francisco. After Frank Zappa and Cannonball Adderley heard him play, they invited him to join their bands. He spent two years with Zappa as a member of The Mothers of Invention, two years with Adderley, then returned to Zappa. Zappa played guitar solos on his album Feel (1974). In 1975 he recorded with Pete Magadini (his Original drummer) the album Polyrhythm on Ibis Recordings. He recorded I Love the Blues She Heard My Cry with Zappa's bandmates Ruth Underwood, Tom Fowler, and Bruce Fowler and jazz guitarist Lee Ritenour.

Duke occasionally recorded under the name Dawilli Gonga, possibly for contractual reasons, when appearing on other artists' albums.

In 1977, Duke fused jazz with pop, funk, and soul music on his album From Me to You. Later, that same year,  his album Reach for It entered the pop charts, and his audiences increased. 
In 1981, he began a collaboration with bassist Stanley Clarke that would last through the 1980s, which combined pop, jazz, funk, and R&B.  Their first album contained the single "Sweet Baby", which became a Top 20 pop hit.

During the 1980s, Duke's career moved to a second phase as he spent much of his time as a record producer. He produced pop and R&B hits for A Taste of Honey, Jeffrey Osborne, and Deniece Williams. His clients included Anita Baker, Rachelle Ferrell, Everette Harp, Gladys Knight, Melissa Manchester, Barry Manilow, The Pointer Sisters, Smokey Robinson, Seawind, and Take 6.

Duke worked as musical director at the 1988 Nelson Mandela 70th Birthday Tribute concert at Wembley Stadium in London. In 1989, he temporarily replaced Marcus Miller as musical director of NBC's late-night music performance program Sunday Night during its first season. He was a judge for the second annual Independent Music Awards.

He died on August 5, 2013, in Los Angeles, at the age of 67 from chronic lymphocytic leukemia.

Awards and honors

Grammy awards
The Grammy Awards are awarded annually by the National Academy of Recording Arts and Sciences. Duke has received two awards out of nine nominations.

Other honors

He was inducted into The SoulMusic Hall of Fame at SoulMusic.com

Al Jarreau recorded the tribute album My Old Friend: Celebrating George Duke (Concord, 2014) with songs written by Duke. Appearing on the album were Gerald Albright, Stanley Clarke, Dr. John, Lalah Hathaway, Boney James, Marcus Miller, Jeffrey Osborne, Greg Phillinganes, Kelly Price, Dianne Reeves (Duke's cousin), and Patrice Rushen. The album received the 2015 NAACP Image Award for Outstanding Jazz Album.

Discography

 The George Duke Quartet Presented By The Jazz Workshop 1966 Of San Francisco (1966)
 Save the Country (1970)
 Solus (First Disc Of The Album The Inner Source) (1971)
 The Inner Source (Second Disc Of The Album The Inner Source) (1973)
 Faces in Reflection (1974)
 Feel (1974)
 The Aura Will Prevail (1975)
 I Love the Blues, She Heard My Cry (1975)
 Liberated Fantasies (1976)
 From Me to You (1977)
 Reach for It (1977)
 The Dream (aka The 1976 Solo Keyboard Album) (1978)
 Don't Let Go (1978)
 Follow the Rainbow (1979)
 Master of the Game (1979)
 A Brazilian Love Affair (1980)
 Dream On (1982)
 Guardian of the Light (1983)
 Rendezvous (1984)
 Thief in the Night (1985)
 George Duke (1986)
 Night After Night (1989)
 Snapshot (1992)
 Illusions (1995)
 Is Love Enough? (1997)
 After Hours (1998)
 Cool (2000)
 Face the Music (2002)
 Duke (2005)
 In a Mellow Tone (2006)
 Dukey Treats (2008)
 Déjà Vu (2010)
 DreamWeaver (2013)

References

External links

 
 
 George Duke at NPR Music
 
 2009 interview at All About Jazz
 2010 interview
 2010 interview for NAMM Oral History Program
 2012 Interview: Part 1 , Part 2 

1946 births
2013 deaths
21st-century American keyboardists
American boogie musicians
American dance musicians
American jazz keyboardists
American jazz pianists
American male pianists
American rhythm and blues keyboardists
American soul keyboardists
American television composers
Atlantic Records artists
Deaths from cancer in California
Deaths from chronic lymphocytic leukemia
Elektra Records artists
Epic Records artists
Grammy Award winners
American funk keyboardists
Heads Up International artists
The Mothers of Invention members
MPS Records artists
Musicians from San Rafael, California
People from Marin County, California
Progressive rock keyboardists
Progressive rock pianists
San Francisco Conservatory of Music alumni
San Francisco State University alumni
Smooth jazz pianists
Tamalpais High School alumni
Warner Records artists
American male jazz musicians
Cannonball Adderley Quintet members
20th-century American keyboardists
Jazz musicians from California
The Phil Collins Big Band members